Q40 may refer to:
 Q40 (motherboard), compatible with the Sinclair QL
 Q40 (New York City bus)
 Al-Shamikh, a corvette of the Royal Navy of Oman
 Ghafir, the 40th chapter of the Quran
 Infiniti G-series (Q40/Q60), an automobile
 Samsung Sens Q40, a laptop